Criva is a village in Briceni District, Moldova.

It is the westernmost point in Moldova and a border crossing point to Mamalyha, Ukraine.

See also
 Extreme points of Moldova

References

Villages of Briceni District
Extreme points of Moldova
Populated places on the Prut
Moldova–Ukraine border crossings
Khotinsky Uyezd